Max and Mina's is an ice cream store in New York City, opened in 1997.

Max and Mina's was named number 1 of the top 10 unique ice cream parlors in America in Everybody Loves Ice Cream, the Whole Scoop on America's favorite treat by Shannos Jackson Arnold, Emmis Books, July 2004. The Travel Channel listed the shop as "one of America's most famous ice cream paradises." Some Manhattan restaurants offer Max & Mina's Ice Cream on their dessert menus. The store has been an answer on Hollywood Squares and in recent versions of Trivial Pursuit.

See also
 List of restaurants in New York City

References

External links
 Official website

Ice cream parlors in the United States
Restaurants in New York City
Restaurants established in 1997